Gaspard Duchange (1662–1757) was a French engraver.

Life

Duchange was born in Paris in 1662. He was a pupil of Guillaume Vallet and then of Jean Audran. He was received into the Academy in 1707 and died in Paris in 1757.

Style
According to Joseph Strutt in his Biographical Dictionary of Engravers (1786), Duchange's style was similar to that of his teacher, Audran, but in general neater, with the use of etching not so predominant. Strutt did not think that Duchange's drawing was as good as Audran's, but concluded that his prints "though mannered, and often rather laboured, have much to recommend them to the connoisseur, especially such as are pleased with agreeable management of the graver."

List of works
Duchange engraved a considerable number of plates. They include:

Portraits
François Girardon; after Rigaud; presented for Duchange's reception into the Academy in 1707.
Charles de La Fosse, painter; after a self-portrait; presented upon the same occasion.
Antoine Coypel, with his Son; after a self-portrait.

Subjects after various artists
After Correggio:
Jupiter and Io
Jupiter and Danae
Jupiter and Ledas

After Paolo Veronese:
The Entombment of Christ

After Jouvenet:
Mary Magdalen washing the Feet of Christ
Christ driving the Buyers and Sellers from the Temple

After Antoine Coypel:
The Sacrifice of Jephtha.
Tobit recovering his Sight
Venus sleeping, with three Loves and a Satyr
The Death of Dido
The Bath of Diana

After Noël-Nicolas Coypel:
Solon explaining his Laws to the Athenians;
Trajan dispensing Justice to the People

After Desormeaux:
Diana disarming Cupid

After Rubens:
The Birth of Mary de' Medici;
The Landing of Mary de' Medici at Marseilles
The Marriage of Henry IV. and Mary de' Medici
The Apotheosis of Henry IV. and Regency of Mary de' Medici
The Interview of Mary de' Medici and her son, Louis XIII
These five last plates were engraved for the Luxembourg Gallery.

Notes

References

Further reading 
 
 

1662 births
1757 deaths
Engravers from Paris
17th-century engravers
18th-century French engravers